Hewitsonia congoensis is a butterfly in the family Lycaenidae. It is found in Cameroon and the Democratic Republic of the Congo (Mongala, Uele, Ituri, North Kivu, Tshopo, Tshuapa, Equateur, Mai-Ndombe, Kwango, Sankuru, Maniema and Lualaba).

References

Butterflies described in 1921
Poritiinae